Hmawbi Saya Thein (1862–1942) was a Burmese writer, known for his articles on Burmese culture and history.

In his travels around the country Thein collected many historical artifacts, manuscripts, traditions and oral history related to Burmese history and culture. Based on his research and collection, he wrote many articles about Burmese culture and history in magazines in colonial Burma. Many of the articles were later collected, some posthumously, and published in book form.

Works

 A Crazy Man's Shoulder Bag: A collection of anecdotes that used to be required reading in the school curriculum.
 An Oral Chronicle: Purported oral history passed down from father to son about events in the court of King Bagyidaw of the Konbaung Dynasty.

References

Burmese writers
1862 births
1942 deaths